Niklas Bernd Dorsch (born 15 January 1998) is a German professional footballer who plays as a midfielder for Bundesliga club FC Augsburg.

Club career

Bayern Munich
On 2 September 2015, Dorsch signed a one-year apprentice contract, lasting until 30 June 2016, followed by a two-year full professional contract from 1 July 2016 until 30 June 2018.

In the 2015–16 season, Dorsch joined the squad of Bayern Munich II, making his debut in the Regionalliga Bayern on 5 March 2016 in a 0–1 away loss against Wacker Burghausen. Dorsch scored his first goal for the reserve team in the first match of the 2016–17 season on 17 July 2016, opening the scoring in the 7th minute of the 2–1 home win against FV Illertissen. The following season, Dorsch became captain of the second team.

In the 2017–18 season, Dorsch made his Bundesliga debut for the first team on 28 April 2018 in a 4–1 home win against Eintracht Frankfurt. Dorsch opened the scoring in the 43rd minute via an assist from Sandro Wagner.

1. FC Heidenheim
On 23 May 2018, Dorsch moved to 2. Bundesliga side 1. FC Heidenheim on a free transfer, with a three-year contract lasting until 30 June 2021.

Gent
On 22 July 2020, Dorsch joined Belgian First Division A side K.A.A. Gent, signing a four-year contract.

FC Augsburg
On 8 July 2021, Dorsch joined Bundesliga side FC Augsburg, signing a five year contract until 30 June 2026.

Career statistics

Club

Honours 

Germany U21
UEFA European Under-21 Championship: 2021

Individual
 Fritz Walter Medal U17 Silver: 2015
UEFA European Under-21 Championship Team of the Tournament: 2021
Bundesliga Goal of the Month: December 2021

Notes

References

External links
 
 

1998 births
Living people
People from Lichtenfels, Bavaria
Sportspeople from Upper Franconia
Footballers from Bavaria
German footballers
Germany youth international footballers
Germany under-21 international footballers
Olympic footballers of Germany
Association football midfielders
FC Bayern Munich II players
FC Bayern Munich footballers
1. FC Heidenheim players
K.A.A. Gent players
FC Augsburg players
Bundesliga players
2. Bundesliga players
Regionalliga players
Belgian Pro League players
German expatriate footballers
Expatriate footballers in Belgium